James Oswald (1715 – 24 March 1769) was a Scottish politician who sat in the House of Commons from 1741 to 1768.

Oswald was the grandson of James Oswald a politician of Kirkcaldy, and son of James Oswald whom he succeeded in c.1725, inheriting his Kirkcaldy home, Dunnikier, now known as the Path House.

His brother John was Bishop of Raphoe and another brother Thomas was an army officer.

He was admitted at Lincoln's Inn in 1733.

The Oswald family became the dominant force in Kirkcaldy politics in the 18th century and Dysart, the second largest burgh was controlled by the St. Clair interest. The combined Oswald and St. Clair influence often decided who was to be elected. In 1747  he exchanged the seat with James St Clair and was elected MP for Fife until 1754. In 1752 he was Commissioner for trade and plantations. Oswald exchanged seats with James St Clair again in 1754 and was elected MP for Dysart Burghs. He was Lord Commissioner of the Treasury in 1760 and Vice-Treasurer of Ireland from 1763 to 1767.

He retired in 1768 when his son James Townsend Oswald took over the seat and died in 1769 at the age of 52. In 1747 he had married Elizabeth, daughter of Joseph Townsend, a London brewer and the widow of Abraham Reynardson. They had 1 son.

References

1715 births
1769 deaths
People from Kirkcaldy
Members of Lincoln's Inn
Members of the Parliament of Great Britain for Scottish constituencies
British MPs 1741–1747
British MPs 1747–1754
British MPs 1754–1761
British MPs 1761–1768